DFRF may refer to:
Dryden Flight Research Center
Democratic Front for the Reunification of the Fatherland